Atlantica (Atlantika) is an ancient continent that formed during the Proterozoic about  (two billion years ago, Ga) from various 2 Ga cratons located in what are now West Africa and eastern South America.

Formation 
Atlantica formed simultaneously with Nena at about 1.9 Ga from Archaean cratons, including Amazonia in present-day South America, and the Congo, West Africa and North Africa Cratons in Africa.

Breakup 

Atlantica separated from Nena between 1.6–1.4 Ga when Columbia — a supercontinent composed of Ur, Nena, and Atlantica — fragmented.

Atlantica and continents Nena and Ur and some minor plates formed the supercontinent Rodinia about 1 Ga ago. Between 1–0.5 Ga Rodinia split into three new continents: Laurasia and East and West Gondwana; Atlantica became the nucleus of West Gondwana.

During this later stage, the Neoproterozoic era, a Brasiliano-Pan African orogenic system developed.  The central part of this system, the Araçuaí-West Congo orogen, has left a distinct pattern of deformations, still present on both sides of the Atlantic Ocean.

See also 
 Plate tectonics

Notes

References 
 
 
 
 
 

Historical continents
Proterozoic
History of the Atlantic Ocean